Augustus B. Wolvin was a  long Great Lakes freighter that had a 63-year career on the Great Lakes. Augustus B. Wolvin was a product of the American Shipbuilding Company of Cleveland, Ohio. She was built for the Acme Steamship Company of Duluth, Minnesota.

She was launched as hull #330 on April 9, 1904. At the time of her launch her nickname was "Yellow Kid". She was powered by a quadruple expansion steam engine attached to a single fixed pitch propeller and fueled by two coal-fired scotch marine boilers. At the time of her launch Augustus B. Wolvin  was the longest vessel operating on the Great Lakes (hence the unofficial title "Queen of the Lakes"), she was also the first vessel that had telescoping steel hatch covers which replaced the old wooden hatch covers.

She was also the first lake freighter built without vertical support beams in her holds.  This innovation allowed for faster, more automated, loading and unloading.

In 1913 the fleet owned by Acme Steamship Company was sold to the Lackawanna Steamship Company of Cleveland, Ohio (managed by Pickands Mather & Company). The fleet was later purchased by Interlake Steamship Company. In 1946 Augustus B. Wolvin had her telescoping hatch covers replaced with new single piece steel hatch covers (the space between the hatch covers was  feet) and a new hatch crane. This rebuild was done by the Great Lakes Engineering Works of Ecorse, Michigan. In 1966 the ship was sold to the Canadian Labrador Steamship Company of Montreal, Quebec.

Scrapping

In June 1967 Augustus B. Wolvin ran aground in the Welland Canal and suffered severe bottom damage. Eventually she was declared a total loss at Port Weller and towed to Hamilton, Ontario. She was sold to the Marine Salvage Inc. of Port Colborne, Ontario. She was resold to a Spanish shipbreaker and towed down the St. Lawrence Seaway in August 1967.

References

Steamships of the United States
1904 ships
Ships built in Cleveland
Merchant ships of the United States
Queen of the Lakes
Steamships of Canada
Maritime incidents in 1967